A supreme court is the highest court of a country or other jurisdiction.

Supreme Court may also refer to:

 A supreme court building housing a given supreme court
 Supreme Court (horse) (1948–1962), a British Thoroughbred racehorse and sire

See also
 Supreme Court clinic